Internet Explorer 11 (IE11) is the eleventh and final version of the Internet Explorer web browser. It was initially included in the release of Windows 8.1, Windows RT 8.1 and Windows Server 2012 R2 on October 17, 2013, and was later released for Windows 7 and Windows Server 2008 R2 on November 7, 2013. It is the successor to Internet Explorer 10, released the previous year, and was the original, default browser in Windows 8.1 and Windows Server 2012 R2, before Microsoft Edge was introduced. Internet Explorer 11 was also included in the release of Windows 10 on July 29, 2015, as well as in Windows Server 2016 and Windows Server 2019. On April 16, 2019, Internet Explorer 11 was made available to Windows Server 2012 and Windows Embedded 8 Standard, the only still supported edition of Windows 8 as the final expansion of Internet Explorer 11 availability. Internet Explorer 11, like its predecessor, IE 10, is not available for Windows Vista, Windows Server 2008 and earlier versions of Windows and Windows Server.

On January 12, 2016, Microsoft adjusted their product lifecycle policies to only support the most recent version of Internet Explorer offered for any given version of Windows. Support for Internet Explorer 11, now regarded as an "OS component", is bound to the version of the Windows it is installed on. Thus, Microsoft provides updates only to currently supported versions of Windows. This includes Windows 7 SP1 (with ESU), Windows 8.1, LTSC and LTSB editions of Windows 10, and server editions of Windows 10, among others, which will continue to receive IE11 updates until their respective end-of-support dates. The exception to this is the Windows 10 Semi-Annual Channel (SAC). For SAC versions of Windows 10, Internet Explorer 11 support ended on June 15, 2022, Internet Explorer was permanently disabled on February 14, 2023 and any remaining icons or shortcuts will be removed on June 13, 2023.

IE Mode, a feature of Microsoft Edge, enables Edge to display web pages using Internet Explorer 11's Trident layout engine and other core components. Through IE Mode, the underlying technology of Internet Explorer 11 partially exists on versions of Windows that do not support IE11 as a proper application, including Windows 11, Windows Server Insider Build 22463 and Windows Server Insider Build 25110. Microsoft has announced support for IE Mode through at least 2029, with a one year advance notice prior to retiring this variant of IE11.

Changes

IE11 features redesigned developer tools, support for WebGL, enhanced scaling for high DPI screens, prerender and prefetch. After launch IE11 got support for HTTP/2. In addition, IE11 supports Full Screen and Orientation APIs, CSS border image support, JavaScript enhancements, DOM mutation observers, Web Cryptography API, video text track support, encrypted media support and an improved HTML editor. IE11 uses Transport Layer Security v1.2 as the default protocol for secure connections and deprecates RC4 cipher suite.

The "document mode" feature in the developer toolset (F12) allows simulating the rendering behaviour of Internet Explorer versions 5 to 10 to facilitate testing pages for compatibility.

Internet Explorer 11 for Windows RT does not support Java and other add-ons.

Removed features
 IE11 has deprecated document.all, meaning that code that checks for its presence will not detect it, but code that actually uses it will continue to work. Additionally, the attachEvent proprietary API has been removed.
 Quick Tabs (CTRL+Q)
 Work Offline command removed from File menu
 Drag and drop of selected content from IE to other programs like Word or WordPad
 Use large icons for command buttons
 Some Group Policy settings are no longer supported.
 Ability to view all cookies at once via Developer Tools
 Ability to disable tabbed browsing
 autocomplete="off" for input type="password"

Added features
 KB3058515 released on June 9, 2015 added HTTP Strict Transport Security support to IE 11.
 KB3139929 bundles a patch which adds advertising of Windows 10 upgrade offer to the new tab page.

Performance
In a November 2013 review by SitePoint, IE11 scored better than Google Chrome 30 and Firefox 26 in WebKit's SunSpider test and Google's WebGL test. It tied with Chrome for fastest in Microsoft's "fish aquarium" benchmark for WebGL and came last in Google's V8 performance benchmark. As a result of the speed improvements, the reviewer said "if you switched to Chrome for speed alone, you're now using the wrong browser." IE11 was also observed to use less memory with multiple tabs open than contemporary versions of Chrome and Firefox.

In August 2015, SitePoint again benchmarked IE11 in its review for Microsoft Edge, where Edge 12, Chrome 44 and Firefox 39 were also present. IE11 came last in Apple's JetStream test (which replaced SunSpider) and Google's Octane test (which replaces V8) but it came second in Microsoft's "fish aquarium" test, after Edge.

History
Though an internal build of IE11 was leaked on March 25, 2013, its first preview version was not formally released until June 2013, during the Build 2013 conference, along with the preview release of Windows Server 2012 R2 and Windows 8.1. On July 25, 2013, Microsoft released the developer preview of Internet Explorer 11 for Windows 7 and Windows Server 2008 R2.

While there were no other releases of Internet Explorer, an update for Windows 7 and 8.1 was released on April 2, 2014 which added Enterprise Mode, improved developer tools, improved support for WebGL and ECMAScript 5.1.

With the release of Windows 11, Windows Server Insider Build 22463 and Windows Server Insider Build 25110, Internet Explorer is no longer preinstalled on any new devices (the application that is, while its core component is due to Microsoft's integration of IE in Windows), but users can still launch Internet Explorer from the Control Panel's browser toolbar settings on or via the PowerShell. Microsoft Edge is the only preinstalled browser in the operating system. An Internet Explorer mode is however provided in Microsoft Edge to run legacy websites. On February 14, 2023, Microsoft permanently disabled IE11 on the Windows 10  Semi-Annual Channel (SAC) as part of a Microsoft Edge update released on February 14, 2023.IE11 visual references, such as the IE11 icons on the Start Menu and taskbar, will be removed from Windows 10 SAC by the June 2023 Windows security update (“B” release) scheduled for June 13, 2023.

See also
 Usage share of web browsers

References

External links
 
 Internet Explorer Test Drive
 IEBlog: Windows Internet Explorer Engineering Team Blog at MSDN Blogs
 Internet Explorer Community Resources at Microsoft Developer Network
 Internet 11 Development Status of Features 

Internet Explorer
2013 software
Windows 8
Windows-only freeware
Windows web browsers
Windows components
News aggregator software